The following is a list of ecoregions in South Africa, as identified by the Worldwide Fund for Nature (WWF).

Terrestrial ecoregions
Listed by major habitat type

Tropical and subtropical moist broadleaf forests

Tropical and subtropical grasslands, savannas, and shrublands

Montane grasslands and shrublands

Mediterranean forests, woodlands, and scrub

Deserts and xeric shrublands

Tundra

Mangroves

Freshwater ecoregions
by bioregion

Zambezi

Southern Temperate

 Amatole-Winterberg Highlands
 Cape Fold
 Drakensberg-Maloti Highlands
 Karoo
 Southern Kalahari
 Southern Temperate Highveld
 Western Orange

Marine ecoregions

References
 Burgess, Neil, Jennifer D’Amico Hales, Emma Underwood (2004). Terrestrial Ecoregions of Africa and Madagascar: A Conservation Assessment. Island Press, Washington DC.
 Spalding, Mark D., Helen E. Fox, Gerald R. Allen, Nick Davidson et al. "Marine Ecoregions of the World: A Bioregionalization of Coastal and Shelf Areas". Bioscience Vol. 57 No. 7, July/August 2007, pp. 573–583.
 Thieme, Michelle L. (2005). Freshwater Ecoregions of Africa and Madagascar: A Conservation Assessment. Island Press, Washington DC.

 
South Africa
Ecoregions
ecoregions